Sepideh Farsi is an Iranian film director, born in Tehran in 1965.

Early years
Farsi left Iran in 1984 and went to Paris to study mathematics.  However, eventually she was drawn to the visual arts and initially experimented in photography before making her first short films. A main theme of her works is identity. She still visits Tehran each year.

Awards/Recognition
Farsi was a Member of the Jury of the Locarno International Film Festival in Best First Feature in 2009. She won the FIPRESCI Prize (2002), Cinéma du Réel and Traces de Vie prize (2001) for "Homi D. Sethna, filmmaker" and Best documentary prize in Festival dei Popoli (2007) for "HARAT".

Recent News
One of her latest films is called Tehran Bedoune Mojavez (Tehran Without Permission).  The 83-minute documentary shows life in Iran's crowded capital city of Tehran, facing international sanctions over its nuclear ambitions and experiencing civil unrest.  It was shot entirely with a Nokia camera phone because of the government restrictions over shooting a film.  The film shows various aspects of city life including following women at the hairdressers talking of the latest fads, young men speaking of drugs, prostitution and other societal problems, and the Iranian rapper “Hichkas”.  The  dialogue is in Persian with English and Arabic subtitles. In December 2009, Tehran Without Permission was shown at the Dubai International Film Festival.

Filmography
 Red Rose (2014)
 Cloudy Greece (2013)
 Zire Âb / The house under the water (2010)
 Tehran bedoune mojavez / Tehran without permission (2009)
 If it were Icarus (2008)
 Harat (2007)
 Negah / The Gaze (2006)
 Khab-e khak / Dreams of Dust (2003)
 Safar-e Maryam / The journey of Maryam (2002)
 Mardan-e Atash / Men of Fire (2001)
 Homi D. Sethna, filmmaker (2000)
 Donya khaneye man ast / The world is my home (1999)
 Khabe Âb / Water dreams (1997)
 Bâd-e shomal / Northwind (1993)

References

External links

Iranian women film directors
Iranian film directors
Iranian documentary filmmakers
Iranian expatriates in France
1965 births
Living people
Iranian diaspora film people
Women documentary filmmakers